Wi Janghang was a prince of Ugeo(the last king of Wiman Joseon). At that time, Emperor Wu of Han sent warrior to surrender Wiman Joseon and his father Ugeo was killed by an assassin. Even after king’s death, some ministers resisted against Han dynasty. Han dynasty made Wi Janghang who already surrendered to kill those ministers and subdued Wiman Joseon.

After surrender, he was appointed to the Marquis of Ji (Hanja:幾侯) by Han dynasty, but in 2 years he was executed for rebellion.

Family
Wi Man (Hanja:衛満), great-father
Ugeo (Hanja:右渠), father and last king of Wiman Joseon

Gallery

See also
Han conquest of Gojoseon

References
 

Early Korean history
Korean people of Chinese descent
Wiman Joseon people
Year of birth unknown
Executed Korean people
2nd-century BC Korean people